Tricky Brains, also known as The Ultimate Trickster, is a 1991 Hong Kong comedy film written and directed by Wong Jing, who also co-stars in the film. The film stars Andy Lau, Stephen Chow, Rosamund Kwan, Chingmy Yau, Ng Man-tat and Waise Lee.

Plot
Jing Koo or Koo Jing (Stephen Chow) is a self-proclaimed Trick Expert who has a wide range of tricks at his disposal, including many practical jokes and some more serious tricks which are even capable of driving a person insane. He uses such tricks to accomplish whatever requests his clients give him. When he is hired by Macky Kam (Waise Lee) to ruin the relationship between Che Man-kit (Andy Lau), an honest employee who works at the same company as Macky, and Lucy Ching (Rosamund Kwan), the company president's daughter whom Macky is romantically interested in, Jing sets up an act to get in the Che household as Kit's long lost younger brother Che Man-jing. Kit is suspicious of Jing at first, but is later convinced that Jing really is his brother and decides to treat him better. He gets Jing to work in the same company and introduces him to Lucy and her friend, Banana Fung (Chingmy Yau), who later on becomes interested in him.

From here Jing attempts to embarrass Kit in front of Lucy at every turn, which includes having Kit drink a cola can dosed with 'irresistible aphrodisiac', a medicine that makes the victim unable to control his sexual desires, but Kit cleverly avoids all of Jing's tricks (without suspecting him). It isn't until a contract-signing event which Kit is responsible for that Jing succeeds, in which he makes everyone from his company leave the room and assaults the other party. As a result, Kit is fired. Seeing this, his father Yan Che (Ng Man-tat) also quits the company despite his retirement only a few months away.

That night, Jing prepares to leave the house, but is given a surprise 'birthday' party by his 'brother' and 'father', which moved him deeply. When Macky contacts Jing and asks him to target Kit yet again, he flat out refuses. Banana overhears the conversation and seeks out the Trick Expert who is actually Jing's true identity. She insists that he target Macky to avenge Kit, and promises that she would marry him in return. Jing and Banana go to meet Kit and his father and tell them the truth. They are furious at first, but eventually accept Jing's help.

Jing takes Yan to his office to discuss plans, but they are confronted by a man who claims himself to be the Ultimate Trick Expert. He is hired by Macky to guard his party where he would propose to Lucy. Kit, Jing and Yan infiltrate the party and search for Lucy. They manage to have Kit propose to Lucy before Macky's men find and pursue them. Jing has an intense showdown with the Ultimate Trick Expert using tricks and comes out victorious by blowing him away with a paint bazooka. Meanwhile, Kit is seized and forced to drink a whole bottle of 'irresistible aphrodisiac', however the overdose causes him to become incredibly strong and muscular instead. He easily subdues Macky and his men, then proceeds to ask Lucy's father for permission to marry her, which he readily agrees.

As Jing and Yan happily watch the scene of Kit and Lucy kissing, Banana approaches Jing and reminds him of their promise. Jing takes Banana to his mother, who was waiting outside, but Yan recognises her as Man-yuk, a one-night stand of his many years ago. The last plot twist is revealed that Jing is, in fact Yan's son and Kit's brother, before the credits roll.

Cast

See also
The Tricky Master, another film directed by Wong Jing centering around trickery

References

External links
 Tricky Brains at chinesemov.com
 Tricky Brains at Hong Kong Cinemagic
 
 

1991 films
1990s Cantonese-language films
1991 comedy films
Hong Kong slapstick comedy films
Films directed by Wong Jing
Films set in Hong Kong
Films shot in Hong Kong
1990s Hong Kong films